Wednesbury Town railway station was a station on the South Staffordshire Line.

History

The station was opened in 1850. The station was built and served by the South Staffordshire Railway, which later became London, Midland and Scottish Railway (through amalgamation of the London and North Western Railway). The line had reasonable passenger usage until about the early 1880s, when it began to slump at several stations, leading to the line becoming a largely freight only operation in 1887. It would remain open for goods traffic, which was considerable at this time, as the district had become highly industrialised in the then heyday of the Black Country's industrial past. It also served as the terminus of the Darlaston Loop which ran from Walsall to Wednesbury via Darlaston and it branched off on the present-day Walsall-Wolverhampton Line. It closed to passengers in the 1880s and then to freight and excursion trains in the 1960s. It is now a footpath between Darlaston and James Bridge but is built on towards Wednesbury Town.

As the local industry declined and road transport became more common, the station entered a post-World War II decline. 
The station was known as Wednesbury until it was renamed Wednesbury 'town' in 1950 as part of nationalisation. British Rail closed the station through the Beeching Axe in 1964 due to decline in freight and passenger custom.

While the electrification of the West Coast Main Line was underway the former GWR line did see a large increase in its traffic and a reopening of the station appear likely, but once the West Coast Main Line had been re-reopened the diverted trains were removed and the additional services quickly reduced. The last Paddington to Birkenhead express train ran on the line in March 1967, and after 1970 it was normally only used by goods trains.

The station buildings were demolished shortly after their closure, but the platform remains intact more than 50 years later. The signal box was still in use when the Walsall-Round Oak section of the line closed in March 1993, but it was destroyed by arsonists in 1995. The level crossing was fenced off around the same time in order for the Midland Metro to be built across the line nearby, although the fence was later vandalized and the line between Wednesbury and Great Bridge is often used a route for pedestrians and dog walkers.

Since closure
The station ruins were fenced off and partly built over by a growing Biffa waste disposal plant by 2010. The plant has been built during the 1990s in one of the station car parks, while the buildings of several small enterprises occupy the other side.

Midland Metro
A £1,100,000/15-year-long regeneration project will see the station become part of the local tram network with the line reopening between Walsall, Dudley Port railway station, Dudley railway station and the Merry Hill Shopping Centre for trams on one track and for freight on the other. The freighters would continue on past Brettell Lane railway station and on to the mainline at Stourbridge Junction.

In March 2011, the business plan for the reopening of the line between Stourbridge and Walsall was submitted to Network Rail. Trams would run along the South Staffordshire line through Wednesbury and Dudley, sharing the line with freight trains.  Andy Street pledged in his mayoral campaign to reopen the line, however there is still no timeline.

References

External links
Rail Around Birmingham and the West Midlands: Wednesbury Town railway station

Disused railway stations in Sandwell
Railway stations in Great Britain opened in 1850
Railway stations in Great Britain closed in 1964
Beeching closures in England
Former London and North Western Railway stations